Bobby Fresques is a former American football quarterback who played one season with the San Jose SaberCats of the Arena Football League. He first enrolled at the University of Wyoming before transferring to California State University, Sacramento.

References

External links
Just Sports Stats
College stats

Living people
Year of birth missing (living people)
American football quarterbacks
Wyoming Cowboys football players
Sacramento State Hornets football players
San Jose SaberCats players